The following list documents mantises in Sri Lanka.

Family: Amorphoscelididae - Bark mantises
Amorphoscelis annulicornis
Amorphoscelis brunneipennis
Amorphoscelis pellucida
Amorphoscelis spinosa

Family: Empusidae - Violin mantises
Empusa pennata
Gongylus gongylodes

Family: Hymenopodidae - Flower mimic mantises
Ambivia popa
Creobroter pictipennis
Creobroter signifer
Hestiasula brunneriana 
Hestiasula ceylonica
Metacromantis oxyops 
Odontomantis micans
Odontomantis pulchra
Pseudoxypilus hemerobius

Family: Iridopterygidae
Hapalopezella maculata 
Iridopteryx iridipennis
Micromantis glauca
Muscimantis montana
Pezomantis henryi 
Tropidomantis (Eomantis) iridipennis

Family: Liturgusidae
Humbertiella affinis
Humbertiella ceylonica
Humbertiella indica
Humbertiella similis
Humbertiella taprobanarum

Family: Mantidae - Praying mantises
Amantis nawai
Armeniola laevis
Asiadodis squilla
Choeradodis strumaria
Compsomantis ceylonica
Deiphobe infuscata
Deiphobella laticeps 
Elmantis lata
Elmantis trincomaliae
Heterochaetula straminea
Hierodula harpyia 
Hierodula membranacea 
Hierodula tenuidentata
Hierodula unimaculata
Hierodula versicolor
Mantis religiosa
Rhombodera taprobanae
Schizocephala bicornis
Statilia maculata
Statilia maculata maculata
Tenodera fasciata

Family: Tarachodidae
Didymocorypha lanceolata
Dysaules uvana
Leptomantella ceylonica
Oxyophthalma engaea
Oxyophthalma gracillis

Family: Thespidae
Parathespis humbertiana

Family: Toxoderidae
Aethalochroa ashmoliana
Cheddikulama straminea
Toxoderopsis spinigera

See also

References

 
.Sri Lanka
Mantodea
Sri Lanka